Selbysport is an unincorporated community in Garrett County, Maryland, United States. Mercy Chapel at Mill Run was listed on the National Register of Historic Places in 1984.

References

Unincorporated communities in Garrett County, Maryland
Unincorporated communities in Maryland